, later known as , was the daughter of Taira no Kiyomori and Taira no Tokiko. She was empress consort of Emperor Takakura.

Tokuko was also the last Imperial survivor from the great naval battle of Dan-no-ura.

Her life became a compelling narrative which survives as both history and literature.

In history

Daughter of an emperor
In 1171, when Tokuko was 17, the emperor had abdicated the throne and entered the Buddhist priesthood, taking the Buddhist name of Gyōshin.

Consort of an emperor

In 1172, Tokuko was married to Shirakawa's fourth and only surviving son, Emperor Takakura. Takakura was also her first cousin as both their mothers were half-sisters. The wedding was an arranged one, as to cement the alliance between the two co-fathers-in-law; Shirakawa sponsored Kiyomori's rise as Chancellor of the Realm, while Kiyomori provided military and financial support to Shirakawa.

Tokuko and Takakura's son, Prince Tokihito, was born in 1178. Just a year later, Kiyomori launched a coup d'état, sacking his political rivals from their posts, banishing them, and replacing them with his allies and clansmen. He even had Shirakawa imprisoned; at this point they fallen out of their political alliance.

In 1180, Emperor Takakura was forced to abdicate by Kiyomori; Prince Tokihito ascended the throne as Emperor Antoku. Now an empress dowager, Tokuko received the name Kenrei-mon In. In this period, the names of the several gates in the walls surrounding the imperial grounds refer not only to the wall-openings themselves; these names were also used to refer indirectly to a nearby residence of an empress whose husband had abdicated, or as an indirect way of referring to an empress dowager herself. For example, whose official home, after the abdication and death of Emperor Takakura, was located near the Kenrei Gate.

Mother of an emperor
Tokuko, now Kenrei-mon In, was mother to Emperor Antoku. The child emperor reigned from 1180 through 1185.

Survivor of Dan-no-ura
Arguably, the most difficult moments in Kenreimon-In's life occurred near the close of the battle of Dan-no-ura, which took place near the southern tip of Honshū in Shimonoseki, Yamaguchi.

 Genryaku 2, on the 24th day of the 3rd month (April 25, 1185): The Taira and the Minamoto clashed for the last time.

The Taira were defeated decisively.  Many of the Taira samurai threw themselves into the waves rather than live to see their clan's ultimate defeat at the hands of the Minamoto.  Antoku's grandmother, Taira no Tokiko, Kiyomori's widow, leapt into the water with the young emperor clasped firmly in her arms.

Kenrei-mon In also tried to drown herself; but according to the conventionally accepted accounts, she was pulled out with a rake by her long hair.

Buddhist nun
This sometime daughter, wife, and mother of emperors became a recluse in her later years.

 Bunji 1, on the 1st day of the 5th month (1185): Kenrei-mon In took the tonsure at Chōraku-ji, a branch temple of Enryaku-ji on Higashiyama.
 Bunji 2, on the 20th day of the 4th month (1186): Gyōshin, the cloistered former-Emperor Go-Shirakawa, visited Kenrei-mon In at her rural retreat in Ōhara.
 Kenkyū 2, in the 2nd month (1192): Kenrei-mon In dies in Ōhara.

This once-pampered great lady is said to have composed this poem in her hermit's hut:

In literature
Many stories and works of art depict this period in Japanese history, and it is through these sources that the life of Taira no Tokuko is best known. The Tale of the Heike is the most famous of the sources from which we learn about this historical character, although many kabuki and bunraku plays reproduce events of the war as well.

The central theme of the Heike story—and the mirrored theme of Taira no Tokuko's life story—is a demonstration of the Buddhist law of impermanence. The theme of impermanence (mujō) is captured in the opening passage:
The sound of the Gion Shōja bells echoes the impermanence of all things; the color of the sāla flowers reveals the truth that the prosperous must decline. The proud do not endure, they are like a dream on a spring night; the mighty fall at last, they are as dust before the wind.

In this and other classic Japanese tales, the central figures are popularly well known, the major events are generally understood, and the stakes as they were understood at the time are conventionally accepted as elements in the foundation of Japanese culture. The accuracy of each of these historical records has become a compelling subject for further study; and some accounts have been shown to withstand close scrutiny, while other presumed “facts” have turned out to be inaccurate.

In English-language literature, Tokuko's life and reign are depicted throughout the two-volume historical fiction narrative, White as Bone, Red as Blood, by Cerridwen Fallingstar, published in 2009 and 2011, respectively.

Notes

References
 Brown, Delmer M. and Ichiro Ishida. (1979). The Future and the Past: a translation and study of the 'Gukanshō'. Berkeley: University of California Press. 
 Kitagawa, Hiroshi and Bruce T. Tsuchida. (1975). The Tale of the Heike. Tokyo: University of Tokyo Press. 
 McCullough, Helen Craig. (1988). The Tale of the Heike. Palo Alto: Stanford University Press. 
 Ponsonby-Fane, Richard. (1959).  The Imperial House of Japan. Kyoto: Ponsonby Memorial Society. OCLC 194887
 Sansom, George Bailey. (1958). A History of Japan to 1334. Stanford, California: Stanford University Press.
 Titsingh, Isaac. (1834). Annales des empereurs du Japon (Nihon Ōdai Ichiran).  Paris: Oriental Translation Fund of Great Britain and Ireland.--Click link to digitized, full-text copy of this book (in French)
 Varley, H. Paul. (1980). "A Chronicle of Gods and Sovereigns: Jinnō Shōtōki of Kitabatake Chikafusa. New York: Columbia University Press.

External links

 Meiji Gakuin University: Heike monogatari (in English)
 University of Virginia: Heike monogatari (in Japanese)
 Kyoto City Tourism and Culture Information System -- Jakkō-in (Ōhara) 
 Kyoto City Tourism and Culture Information System -- Chōraku-ji (Kyoto) 

Japanese empresses
Japanese Buddhist nuns
Taira clan
12th-century Buddhist nuns
13th-century Buddhist nuns
12th-century Japanese women
13th-century Japanese women
People of Heian-period Japan
People of Kamakura-period Japan
1155 births
1214 deaths
Deified Japanese people
Heian period Buddhist nuns